The Grey Cairns of Camster are two large Neolithic chambered cairns located about  south of Watten and  north of Lybster in Caithness, in the Highland region of Scotland. They are among the oldest structures in Scotland, dating to about 5,000 years ago. The cairns demonstrate the complexity of Neolithic architecture, with central burial chambers accessed through narrow passages from the outside. They were excavated and restored by Historic Environment Scotland in the late 20th century and are open to the public.

Location

The cairns, which are considered to be examples of the Orkney-Cromarty type of chambered cairn, were constructed in the third or fourth millennium BC in a desolate stretch of boggy peat-covered moorland in the Flow Country of Caithness. The cairns are located just to the west of a minor road built in the 19th century to link Watten and Lybster. Although the surrounding countryside is now inhospitable and sparsely inhabited, during the Stone Age it was fertile farming land and only became covered in peat during the Bronze Age.

Description

Camster Long

The two chambers appear to have originally been constructed within separate round cairns, which were only later incorporated into a single long cairn for unknown reasons.

The chambers are both entered via passages leading from the south-east side of the cairn. When the tomb was excavated, both compartments were found to contain human bones mingled with broken and unburnt animal bones from horses, oxen, pigs and deer.

The first  is straight and mostly intact, though the inner end is roofless and broken down. At the point where it reaches the chamber, the passageway turns 45° through a portal made from two upright slabs. There may be a third as yet undiscovered chamber at the south-west end, suggested by the presence of exposed upright stones which may indicate the presence of a portal.

Camster Round

Its form may be similar to that of the original separate round cairns that were later amalgamated into Camster Long. The passage appears to have been deliberately put out of use by blocking it up with stones piled up to the height of its roof. It appears that bodies were placed there in a sitting position, though, oddly, without leg bones; the legs appear either to have been removed or to have rotted off before the bodies were deposited in the cairn.

Archaeology

The first archaeological investigations of the cairns was carried out between 1865–6 by Joseph Anderson and Robert Shearer, who investigated a total of seven chambered tombs in Caithness including the two at Camster. The Camster Round Cairn was investigated in 1865, followed by the Camster Long Cairn in 1866.

Between 1966-1968, limited studies were carried out by P.R. Ritchie, where some debris was removed and preparatory work was done for the purpose of conservation. Large-scale studies were subsequently carried out between 1971–3 by John Corcoran. However, his illness and death during the excavations meant that the results of his work were not published. Lionel Masters took up the task of completing the excavation and carrying out archaeological research and conservation between 1976–80. The task of consolidating and restoring the cairns was finally concluded in 1981.

References

Bibliography

External links

 Grey Cairns of Camster – Historic Scotland/Alba Aosmhor
 Camster Long and Camster Round – Royal Commission on the Ancient and Historical Monuments of Scotland
 Photographs of the Grey Cairns by Martin McCarthy
 Highland Council Historic Environment Record

4th-millennium BC architecture in Scotland
3rd-millennium BC architecture in Scotland
1865 archaeological discoveries
Archaeological sites in Caithness
Historic Environment Scotland properties
Scheduled monuments in Scotland
Stone Age sites in Scotland
Neolithic Scotland
Chambered cairns in Scotland